The second season of ¿Quién es la máscara? premiered on Las Estrellas on October 11, 2020, and lasted for 10 episodes. On December 13, 2020, Disco Ball (singer María León) was declared the winner, and Mapache (singer Paty Cantú) the runner-up.

Production 
The second season featured 18 new costumes. Filming of the season began on August 24, 2020. On September 17, 2020, Televisa suspended production on the series after it announced seven COVID-19 cases among its talent and production team in three productions in progress. Two of the cases were panelist Consuelo Duval and host Omar Chaparro. Production resumed on September 28, 2020. Ten episodes were confirmed.

Panelists and host 

Singer Yuri, actress and comedian Consuelo Duval, and singer Carlos Rivera returned as panelists. Adrián Uribe did not return as a panelist and was replaced by Juanpa Zurita. Omar Chaparro returned as host.

Throughout the season, various guest panelists appeared as the fifth panelist in the panel for one episode. These guest panelists included season 1 contestant Mario Bautista (episode 4), actress Itati Cantoral (episode 5), news anchor Paola Rojas (episode 6), season 2 contestant El Escorpión Dorado (episode 7), television personality Galilea Montijo (episode 8).

Contestants

Episodes

Week 1 (October 11)

Week 2 (October 18)

Week 3 (October 25)

Week 4 (November 1) 
 Group number: "No Es Serio Este Cementerio" by Mecano

Week 5 (November 8)

Week 6 (November 15)

Week 7 (November 22)

Week 8 (November 29)

Week 9 (December 6)

Week 10 (December 13) 
 Group number: "All I Want for Christmas Is You" by Mariah Carey

Ratings

Notes

References

2020 Mexican television seasons
¿Quién es la máscara? (Mexican TV series)